Alan Cantwell (born 1968) is an Irish journalist, presenter and newsreader, best known as the former anchor of TV3 News at 5.30 and later the 5.30.

Career
Cantwell began his broadcasting career at the age of seventeen working in pirate radio in Dublin. He spent a number of years working with Capitol Radio under the pseudonym of Dave Carney. He later joined legitimate radio when he moved to Clare FM in the early 1990s. He spent five years here as head of news and current affairs. He subsequently became editor-in-chief of Independent Network News (INN) in Dublin. He later joined 98FM as host of a popular late-night chat show.

In 1998 Cantwell joined TV3 when the new station launched in September that year. Since then he has been the station's lead male newsreader. When TV3 launched Midday in 2008, Cantwell was included as one of the presenters along with Colette Fitzpatrick and Martin King. His stint in this role proved controversial and earned him the nickname "Alan Rantwell"; he was dropped from the programme after just a year as presenter. His removal was part of a wider shake-up of the programme.

In May 2011, Cantwell fronted TV3's television coverage of Queen Elizabeth II's visit to the Republic of Ireland.

On 22 November 2012, Cantwell announced that he is to leave TV3 and he subsequently resigned from his position as TV3 news anchor on 4 January 2013.

On 28 November 2012, he was startled live on air by a loud noise which visibly shook him.

In October 2015 it was announced that Cantwell would be returning to the station after a two-year absence.

In May 2016 Cantwell resigned from TV3 again, to take up the post of press advisor to Mary Mitchell O'Connor after the Dún Laoghaire TD was appointed to Cabinet as jobs minister. In November 2016 it was announced he was resigning, citing “personal reasons”.

Personal life
Cantwell is married and has two children.

References

External links
 

1968 births
Living people
People from Dún Laoghaire
Virgin Media News newsreaders and journalists